In rail transport, a retarder is a device installed in a classification yard used to reduce the speed of freight cars as they are sorted into trains.

Construction
Each retarder consists of a series of stationary brakes surrounding a short section of each on the track that grip and slow the cars' wheels through friction as they roll through them.

Computer control
Modern retarders are computer controlled to apply a precise amount of pressure on the wheels so that cars rolling down a yard's hump are slowed to a safe speed for coupling with cars already standing on the yard's tracks.

Inert retarder
An inert retarder holds a cut of classified railcars to keep them from rolling out of a yard.

See also
 Dowty retarders
Retarder (mechanical engineering)
 Wheel stop

References

Rail yards
Railway buildings and structures
Rail freight transport